Großer Uhlenbach is a river of Lower Harz, Saxony-Anhalt, Germany. It is a right tributary of the Uhlenbach.

See also
List of rivers of Saxony-Anhalt

Rivers of Saxony-Anhalt
Rivers of Germany